Here Comes That Weird Chill EP is a preview of Bubblegum by Mark Lanegan. The primary vocal version of "Sleep with Me", track 8 on the UK release, was omitted from the North American pressing.

Background
In his 2017 book I Am the Wolf: Lyrics & Writings, Lanegan states that the songs on Here Comes that Weird Chill were recorded at the same time as the material that would be included on his next album Bubblegum:

In the same book Lanegan singles out "Skeletal History" as a favorite, noting "I tried to channel the free form vocalisms of SST band Saccharine Trust to chart the skewed evolution of my own damaged species."  The album also includes a cover of the Captain Beefheart song "Clear Spot."

Reception
James Christopher Monger of AllMusic states, "Ex-Screaming Trees frontman Mark Lanegan growls his way through 'Methamphetamine Blues' like Small Change-era Tom Waits singing something off of Mule Variations...The sound is a bit muddy throughout and the vocals are often treated excessively, but considering the "extras" tag these are minor gripes, especially when assaulted by the machine gun imagery that snakes its way through 'Skeletal History.'"

Track listing

Personnel
Chris Goss - bass, guitar, vocals, backing vocals 
Josh Homme - bass, guitar, drums
Nick Oliveri - organ, synthesizer, bass, backing vocals, voices 
Alain Johannes - guitar, multi-instruments, engineer, loops, mixing, post-production 
Dave Catching - rhythm guitar
Greg Dulli - drums, backing vocals 
Dean Ween - guitar 
Aldo Struyf (Millionaire) - synthesizer 
Keni Richards - piano
Oliver Goldstein - synthesizer, harmonica, keyboards 
Adam Maples - drums 
Ed Crawford - guitar 
Mary Huff - piano 
Jonathan Russo - bass, assistant
Brett Netson - backing vocals 
Technical
Tracy Chisholm - engineer, loops, mixing 
Jonas G. - engineer, post-production 
Stephen Marcussen - mastering 
Pete Martinez - assistant engineer
Edmond Monsef - assistant engineer
Ben Mumphrey - assistant engineer
Rail Jon Rogut - mixing, pro-tools  
Rick "Soldier" Will - engineer, mixing

References

Mark Lanegan albums
2003 debut EPs
Beggars Banquet Records EPs